The football tournament at the 1987 Southeast Asian Games was held from 10 to 20 September 1987 in Jakarta, Indonesia.

Teams 

 (entered an under-19 team)

Tournament

Group stage

Group A

Group B

Knockout stage

Semi-finals

Bronze medal match

Gold medal match

Winners

Medal winners

Notes

References 
Veroeveren, Piet, "Southeast Asian Games 1987". RSSSF
SEA Games 1987 AFF official website

Southeast
Football at the Southeast Asian Games
International association football competitions hosted by Indonesia
1987 Southeast Asian Games